Csilla is a Hungarian feminine given name that comes from the Hungarian word csillag, literally meaning star. The name may refer to people:
Csilla Balázs (born 1996), Hungarian–Romanian footballer 
Csilla Bátorfi (born 1969), Hungarian table tennis player
Csilla von Boeselager (1941-1994), Hungarian Baroness
Csilla Borsányi (born 1987), Hungarian former tennis player 
Csilla Füri (born 1972), Hungarian modern pentathlete
Csilla Hegedüs (born 1967), Romanian politician 
Csilla Madarász (born 1943), Hungarian swimmer 
Csilla Molnár (1969-1986), Hungarian beauty queen
Csilla Németh (born 1989), Hungarian handball player
Csilla Rózsa (born 1997), Hungarian golfer
Csilla Szentpéteri (born 1965), Hungarian pianist
Csilla Tatár (born 1983), Hungarian reporter and presenter

Hungarian feminine given names